Baron Jessel, of Westminster in the County of London, was a title in the Peerage of the United Kingdom. It was created on 8 January 1924 for Sir Herbert Jessel, 1st Baronet, who had earlier represented St Pancras South in Parliament as a Liberal Unionist from 1896 to 1906 and as a Conservative from 1910 to 1918. He had already been created a Baronet, of Westminster in the County of London, in the Baronetage of the United Kingdom 1917. Jessel was the younger son of Sir George Jessel, Solicitor-General and Master of the Rolls, and the younger brother of Sir Charles Jessel, 1st Baronet, who was created a Baronet in 1883 in recognition of his father's services. Lord Jessel was succeeded by his son, the second Baron, who served as a Deputy Speaker of the House of Lords from 1963 to 1977. Both titles became extinct on his death on 13 June 1990.

Barons Jessel (1924)
Herbert Merton Jessel, 1st Baron Jessel (1866–1950)
Edward Herbert Jessel, 2nd Baron Jessel (1904–1990)
Hon. Timothy Edward Jessel (1935–1969)

See also
Sir George Jessel
Jessel Baronets, of Ladham

References

Extinct baronies in the Peerage of the United Kingdom
Noble titles created in 1924
Noble titles created for UK MPs